Felipe Cordeiro de Araujo is a Brazilian professional footballer who plays as a right back for Botafogo-PB.

Career
On 24 August 2009, he joined Copa Sul-Americana.

Career statistics

Honours 
'Confiança
 Campeonato Sergipano: 2017

References

External links
 Galo Digital
goal

 ogol.com
 100 anos Galo

1991 births
Living people
Brazilian footballers
Association football fullbacks
Campeonato Brasileiro Série A players
Campeonato Brasileiro Série C players
Campeonato Brasileiro Série D players
Clube Atlético Mineiro players
Tupi Football Club players
Associação Atlética Caldense players
Anápolis Futebol Clube players
Red Bull Brasil players
Esporte Clube Santo André players
Madureira Esporte Clube players
Grêmio Novorizontino players
Guarani Esporte Clube (MG) managers
Agremiação Sportiva Arapiraquense players
Associação Desportiva Confiança players
Brazilian football managers